Holarrhena floribunda, commonly known as the false rubber tree, conessi bark or kurchi bark, is a plant in the family Apocynaceae.

Description
Its fragrant flowers feature a white corolla.

Distribution and habitat
Holarrhena floribunda is found in a variety of habitats from sea-level to  altitude. The plant is native to a wide range of West and Central Africa from Senegal to Angola.

Uses
Holarrhena floribunda is locally used in traditional medicine as a treatment for dysentery, diarrhoea, fever, snakebite, infertility, venereal disease, diabetes and malaria. The plant has been used as arrow poison.

References

External links
 

floribunda
Plants used in traditional African medicine
Flora of Africa
Plants described in 1834